The pork mutiny was an incident in Northern Finland in 1922. On February 2 a group of roughly armed Red Guard members crossed the Finnish-Soviet border near Kuolajärvi and Savukoski after disarming a company of the Finnish border guards. They advanced to a logging yard owned by Kemijoki Oy. They arrested the heads of the yard and confiscated the cashbox.

The incident derives its name from the fact that the leader of the Red Guardists, Frans Myyryläinen, stood on a crate that had formerly contained pork when he delivered his speech called the 'Declaration of Battle of the Red Guerrilla Battalion of the North'. After the speech, 283 workers and members of their families joined the battalion and were armed and given money. The Battalion then made its way back to the border. On its way, it robbed a group of border guards and other workplaces. On February 7, the battalion, by that time about 240 men, crossed the border back to the Soviet Union. Information of the incident was received at Rovaniemi only on February 5, and the battalion managed to slip away before a group of the White Guard arrived.

See also
Aunus expedition
Finnish Civil War
Heimosodat

References

Citations

Russian Civil War
1922 in Finland
Finland–Russia relations
Finland–Soviet Union relations
Rebellions in Finland
Conflicts in 1922